The Anne Arundel County Police Department is the primary law enforcement agency of Anne Arundel County, Maryland, United States, serving a population of more than 564,195 per 2015 census estimates across  of jurisdiction. The Department was created by an Act of the Maryland General Assembly in 1937, and originally consisted of a Chief of Police, three sergeants, and seventeen patrolmen.

, the department is staffed by approximately 770 sworn officers and more than 200 civilian members, including chaplains, crime scene technicians, animal control officers, communications call-takers and dispatchers, and volunteer "reserve officers" under the leadership of Chief of Police, Amal Awad. The Anne Arundel County Police Department has been internationally accredited through the Commission on Accreditation for Law Enforcement Agencies since July 30, 1994.

Facilities
The Anne Arundel County Police Department is divided into four police districts, Northern, Eastern, Western and Southern. The Northern District Station is located in Brooklyn Park, Eastern District is in Pasadena, Western District is in Odenton, and Southern District is in Edgewater. Additional facilities are the Police Department Headquarters in Millersville, the Special Operations Division Complex in Millersville, the K-9 center in Millersville, the Criminal Investigation Division in Millersville and the Police Training Academy in Davidsonville. The agency also has several sub-stations at various locations throughout the county, including one at Arundel Mills Mall.

Community Relations
The section provides community service-oriented support in the areas of crime prevention and community relations, provides a variety of educational and community-based recreational youth programs and oversees the department’s volunteer program and the Office of the Chaplain. The section serves as a direct liaison with community groups to foster a better working relationship between the department and the communities.

Crime Prevention
Through its Crime Prevention Unit, the section provides support and subject matter expertise in the area of crime prevention and avoidance. It conducts crime avoidance surveys for businesses and residences, and oversees neighborhood watch programs. The Crime Prevention Unit also manages the department’s volunteer Reserve Officer program, the Volunteers in Police Service (VIPS) program, and the Office of the Chaplain. The Office of the Chaplain provides counseling and spiritual support to Department employees.

Special Operations

The Special Operations Division includes the Quick Response Team (QRT/SWAT TEAM), K-9 Unit, Traffic Safety Section, and Aviation Unit. QRT and K9  provide tactical support for a variety of department activities including patrol operations, high-risk warrant service, selective patrol and narcotics operations, dignitary protection, and response to hostage, barricade, and terrorist incidents.

The Traffic Safety Section is responsible for investigating all life threatening and fatal traffic crashes.  This Section also manages several traffic related programs and handles all escorts.

The Aviation Unit provides aerial tactical support of ground units including traffic enforcement, aerial observation and pursuits, missing persons, search and rescue, tactical patrol operations, and extraordinary police incidents.

Communications
Anne Arundel County operates an 800 MHz trunked radio system for all county police, fire and DPW communications. Broadcasts are currently digital communications for law enforcement; however fire, DPW and other users are still analog as of April 12, 2019. A new radio system is currently being installed and eventually all users will be digital.

Body Worn Cameras 
The Anne Arundel County Police Department began the requisition process for the Axon III body worn camera system in July 2020.  As of September of 2021, all uniformed officers have been trained in the use of, and are required to wear their issued body worn camera while on duty.

Weapons

Handguns
All sworn officers are issued a Glock 17 or 19 9mm as the primary sidearm. The department previously carried Sig Sauer P229 and transitioned in 2019.

Long guns
Remington 870 shotguns and AR-15 rifles are issued on each patrol shift.

Other
An ASP baton, O.C. spray and Tasers are issued to all officers. The department is in the process of transitioning from TASER X26P to the new TASER 7.
"Less lethal" beanbag shotguns are issued on each shift for de-escalation in unavoidable use of force encounters.

Vehicles include marked and unmarked Ford models including Taurus Interceptors, Utility Interceptors, and F-150 trucks. The department also utilizes a variety of covert vehicles for special assignments.

Rank structure 
The Department uses the following rank structure:

Past chiefs

See also

 List of law enforcement agencies in Maryland
 Anne Arundel County

References

External links
Official Website
Detailed History of the Anne Arundel County, MD Police Department

1937 establishments in Maryland
Police
County police departments of Maryland